"Homer and Ned's Hail Mary Pass" is the eighth episode of the sixteenth season of the American animated television series The Simpsons. It originally aired on the Fox network in the United States on February 6, 2005. It is a Super Bowl-themed episode that was broadcast the day American Dad! premiered and after Super Bowl XXXIX.

This is the first episode in which Comic Book Guy's real name, Jeff Albertson, is revealed to the audience.

Plot
The Simpsons go to Springfield Park and find it has become a trash-strewn dump, but they see a nearby charity carnival which is raising money to help the park. Bart wins the grand prize in a carnival game, and then Homer beats him, going into an extended victory dance. Ned Flanders captures the dance on video and Comic Book Guy places it on his website. Soon, the entire world has seen Homer's embarrassing dance, humiliating him. However, several major sports stars ask Homer to teach them elaborate victory dances.

Meanwhile, Ned uses his camera to make a movie about Cain (Rod) and Abel (Todd). Everyone loves the film, except Marge, who finds it bloody and disgusting. Mr. Burns decides to finance Ned's next film, "Tales of the Old Testament" (which has a running time of 800 minutes – more than 13 hours). The bloodiness of the film angers Marge and she announces at the screening that she will protest anything that Burns owns. Burns retorts, noting that he owns the town's nuclear power plant and there is no other power source. When the crowd blurt out alternative forms of power they can use Burns admits defeat and says the film will never be seen again, much to Ned's dismay.

Homer's victory dances annoy some purist fans but become so popular that he is recruited by professional football to choreograph the Super Bowl halftime show. When he is unable to think of any ideas with the game looming the following night, Homer finds Ned at church. Together they decide to stage one of Ned's Bible stories at the show. At the Super Bowl, Ned and Homer stage the story of Noah's Ark, at the end of which Ned appears and reads a passage from the Bible. The audience jeers and boos, while both Homer and Ned are disappointed. The media and the general public later accuse the Super Bowl of forcing Christianity onto the country via their "blatant display of decency".

Production
The episode is notable for revealing the real name of the character Comic Book Guy to be Jeff Albertson. It was a long-running gag on the show that the character's name never be revealed, with other characters referring to him as "Comic Book Guy". The writers had intended to name the character as early as his first episode, but they could not think of a name for him, and they called him "Comic Book Guy", with the intention of naming the character the next time they used him. However, they kept putting it off. Showrunner Al Jean remarked: "That was specifically done to make people really mad. We just tried to pick a generic name. It was also the Super Bowl show. We did it so the most people possible would see it." Matt Groening stated that he had originally intended him to be called Louis Lane and be "obsessed and tormented by" Lois Lane, but was out of the room when the writers named him.

Cultural references
Mario is seen on the "Italians Touring America" bus and he fights Homer in a manner similar to Donkey Kong.
Pac-Man and Ms. Pac-Man also appear in the episode (actors in costumes) at their wedding, along with the ghosts from the games, on TV when Homer is watching the Super Bowl half-time shows over the years.
Ned's violent films are a parody of modern Biblical films such as The Passion of the Christ, which were criticized for their violent content.
There are also similarities between the films made by Flanders and those made in the 1950s by Cecil B. DeMille. Films such as Ben Hur (1959) and The Ten Commandments (1956), both made all the more famous by the star of both films, Charlton Heston.
After the scene of Pac-Man's wedding, the song playing is "Physical" by Olivia Newton-John.
The screenplay for Citizen Kane is visible on Ned's bookshelf.
The logo for Burns' Celluloid Whimsies is a parody of the Columbia Pictures logo.

Reception 
The original broadcast of the episode was watched by 23.1 million people, making it the most-watched episode since season 14's "I'm Spelling as Fast as I Can". It finished sixth in the weekly ratings for the week of January 31–February 6, 2005.

References

External links

 Dorks-Gone-Wild.com, a website designed by the Fox network specifically for this episode (archived March 3, 2006)
 

2005 American television episodes
The Simpsons (season 16) episodes
Super Bowl lead-out shows
American football animation
Super Bowl in fiction